Danila Denisovich Proshlyakov (born 8 March 2000) is a Russian football player who plays as a centre-forward for FC Saturn Ramenskoye.

Club career
He made his debut in the Russian Football National League for FC Spartak-2 Moscow on 17 July 2018 in a game against PFC Sochi.

On 11 July 2019, he signed a 4-year contract with FC Rostov. He made his Russian Premier League debut for Rostov on 9 March 2020 in a game against PFC CSKA Moscow, he substituted Eldor Shomurodov in the 90th minute.

On 18 August 2020 he joined FC Torpedo Moscow on loan for the 2020–21 season. On 29 December 2020, Torpedo terminated the loan. On 12 January 2021, he joined FC Veles Moscow on loan until the end of the 2020–21 season.

Career statistics

References

External links
 
 
 Profile by Russian Football National League

2000 births
Footballers from Moscow
Living people
Russian footballers
Russia youth international footballers
Association football forwards
FC Spartak Moscow players
FC Spartak-2 Moscow players
FC Rostov players
FC Torpedo Moscow players
FC Veles Moscow players
FC Saturn Ramenskoye players
Russian Premier League players
Russian First League players
Russian Second League players